Karnal Sher Khan (1 January 1970 – 5 July 1999) was a military officer of the Pakistan Army. He was one of only eleven recipients of the Nishan-e-Haider. He was a captain in the 27th Sindh Regiment of the Pakistan Army and later was posted to 12th NLI Regiment during the Kargil Conflict. He was martyred  in action during the Kargil War. For his bravery during the Kargil War, he was awarded Nishan-e-Haider, which is Pakistan's highest military gallantry award. His name is the localised form of the rank Colonel.

Personal life
Karnal Sher Khan was born on 1 January 1970 into a Pashtun family in Naway Kallay, Swabi, KPK. He was the youngest of two brothers and two sisters. His mother died when he was 6 years old. Colonel Sher Khan was raised by his father. Khan completed his intermediate education at a government postgraduate college in Swabi and later joined Pakistan Armed Forces.

Throughout his life, Khan cared about the poor people in his area and spent most part of his salary helping them.

Military career 
After completing his intermediate education, Khan first joined Pakistan Air Force (PAF) as an Airman but later joined Pakistan Army as a commissioned officer in 1992. On 14 October 1994, Khan was commissioned in the 27th Sindh Regiment of Pakistan army.

During the Kargil War, Khan was deployed at the Gultari region. He along with his fellow soldiers established five strategic posts at height of 17,000 feet at Gultari. Indian Army launched eight attacks on their position to capture the strategic posts. However, Khan and his men were able to defend those strategic posts. On 5 July 1999, the Indian army launched another attack and surrounded his posts with two battalions. With heavy mortar fire, the Indian Army captured one of his posts. Khan personally led a successful counter-attack and was able to re-capture the lost post. Despite shortage of ammunition and men, Khan was successful in forcing the enemy to retreat. However, during the battle he was hit by machine gun fire and was martyred.

Indian Army Brigadier M. P. S. Bajwa was impressed by the actions of Captain Khan and wrote to the government of Pakistan citing the bravery of the young officer. Bajwa wrote a citation for Khan and placed it in his pocket while returning his body to the Pakistani officials. Khan's actions during the war were also vouched by his fellow Pakistani soldiers and Khan was posthumously awarded Pakistan's highest military honour, the Nishan-e-Haider.

Awards and decorations

Legacy
Karnal Sher Khan's home town Naway Kallay was renamed as Karnal Sher Khan Kallay. A mausoleum was established in his hometown where his body lays in rest. Every year officials from Pakistani Government, Pakistan Armed Forces and other locals visit the tomb to offer prayer.

A cadet college has been named after him in the village Ismaila near the native town of Karnal Sher Khan Shaheed (NH). It is located on the main Mardan-Swabi Road, approximately midway between Mardan (23 km) and Swabi (25 km). It can also be accessed from Grand Trunk Road through Nowshera-Mardan and from Swabi or Rashakai interchange on the Motorway (M1).

A road in the F-11 sector of Pakistan's capital city Islamabad is named after him. Many roads are named after him in military cantonments across the country.

See also
Havaldar Lalak Jan

References 

 

1970 births
1999 deaths
Recipients of Nishan-e-Haider
People from Swabi District
People of the Kargil War
Pakistani military personnel killed in action
Pashtun people